Paul Alan Hunter (14 October 1978 – 9 October 2006) was an English professional snooker player. He was a three-time Masters champion, winning the event in 2001, 2002, and 2004, recovering from a deficit in the final to win 10–9 on all three occasions. He also won three ranking events: the Welsh Open in 1998 and 2002, and the British Open in 2002. During the 2004–05 snooker season, he attained a career-high ranking of number four in the world.

In March 2005, Hunter was diagnosed with neuroendocrine tumours, but continued to play for several months afterwards. He died shortly before his 28th birthday in October 2006. In his memory, a tournament in Fürth, Germany, was renamed the Paul Hunter Classic and, in April 2016, the Masters trophy was renamed the Paul Hunter Trophy. A prolific break-builder, he made 114 century breaks, the highest being a 146 in the 2004 Premier League.

Early life
Hunter was born on 14 October 1978 in Leeds, England, and was educated at St Andrews Primary School and Cardinal Heenan High School. At a young age, Hunter played alongside his father, Alan, and won many amateur junior events including the England Doubles Championship aged 14 alongside Richard Brooke. He often travelled to Bradford to practise alongside professional player Joe Johnson. Hunter was the runner-up at the 1995 English Amateur Championship, losing in the final 7–8 to David Gray. Guided by Jimmy Michie and Johnson, Hunter made his professional debut in July 1995 at age 16.

Career

Early career (1995–2000) 
Four months after his professional debut, Hunter reached the second round of the 1995 UK Championship by defeating world number six Alan McManus 9–4. At the 1996 Welsh Open, he reached the semi-final aged 17, the youngest player to do so at a ranking event. He defeated the world champion Stephen Hendry in the last 16. He also reached the quarter-finals of the 1996 UK Championship, where he completed a whitewash of Willie Thorne 9–0, and beat James Wattana 9–5 and Terry Murphy 9–7, before losing 5–9 against Hendry, who won the event. Due in part to this performance, Hunter was awarded a wildcard to play at the 1997 Masters, where he lost 1–5 against Mark Williams in the first round. In 1997, he was disqualified from the Grand Prix after testing positive for cannabis. He was later fined £4,550 and docked the 1,140 ranking points he earned at the event from reaching the last 16.

Hunter won his first ranking tournament at the 1998 Welsh Open. He defeated Paul Wykes 5–3, Neal Foulds 5–2, Steve Davis 5–3, Nigel Bond 5–4, Alan McManus 5–3, and Peter Ebdon 6–1, before beating John Higgins 9–5 in the final. During the final, Hunter trailed 2–4 but won seven frames from the next eight to win the match and tournament. Following the event, he reached the semi-finals of the 1998 UK Championship, defeating both Jimmy White and Steve Davis, before losing to John Higgins. He was later named the Snooker Writers Association's Young Player of the Year for 1998.

Hunter first qualified to play in the World Snooker Championship in 1999, where he lost 8–10 in the first round to the eventual champion Stephen Hendry. His form that season elevated him to 12th in the 1999–2000 world rankings resulting in automatic qualification into the final stages of ranking tournaments for the first time, a position he retained for the 2000–01 season.

He reached the quarter-final stage or better in six tournaments the following season: he was a runner-up at the 2001 Welsh Open, a semi-finalist at the British Open and Scottish Open, and a quarter-finalist at the Grand Prix and China Open.

Masters champion (2001–2004) 
At the 2001 Masters, Hunter defeated defending champion Matthew Stevens 6–5 in the first round, Peter Ebdon 6–3 in the quarter-finals and Stephen Hendry 6–4 in the semi-finals. In the final, Hunter met Fergal O'Brien. He trailed 3–7, but won seven out of the next nine frames to win 10–9 and earn the £175,000 first prize. After winning the championship, Hunter commented he and his girlfriend had sex between sessions when he trailed 2–6, which had caused him to play significantly better.

At the following year's Masters, he retained his title. He defeated Stephen Lee 6–3 in the first round, Peter Ebdon 6–5 in the quarter-finals and Alan McManus 6–5 in the semi-finals to reach the final, where he met Mark Williams. Hunter lost the first five frames of the final, but won the match and tournament 10–9. Hunter was only the third player to retain the Masters, following Cliff Thorburn and Stephen Hendry. Hunter won his second ranking event the same year, defeating Ken Doherty 9–2 in the final to take the 2002 Welsh Open title. This was his second win at the Welsh Open. Quinten Hann later defeated Hunter 9–10 in the first round of the 2002 World Championship. Later in 2002, Hunter won his third ranking event, the British Open, defeating Ian McCulloch 9–4 in the final. As defending Masters champion, Hunter progressed to the semi-finals of the 2003 event but lost 3–6 to Mark Williams.

He defeated Ali Carter 10–5, Matthew Stevens 13–6 and defending champion Peter Ebdon 13–12 to reach the semi-finals of the 2003 World Snooker Championship. In his best-of-33 frames semi-final, Hunter established a 15–9 overnight lead over Ken Doherty, however, he won only one of the remaining nine frames, and lost 16–17. The BBC later broadcast the match as a Crucible Classic during the original dates for the 2020 World Snooker Championship when the event was postponed because of the COVID-19 pandemic in the United Kingdom. Despite the loss, he earned a place in the world's top eight in the 2003-2004 world rankings for the first time in his career, having been ranked number nine for the previous two seasons.

In 2003–04, Hunter won the Masters for the third time in four years. He trailed Ronnie O'Sullivan throughout the entire match 1–6, 2–7, 6–8 and 7–9 before winning the final three frames to seal the sixth title of his professional career. He made five century breaks in the match. Hunter reached the final of the 2004 Players Championship, but lost 7–9 against Jimmy White. At the 2004 Premier League Snooker event, he made his career highest break, a 146 in a 3–5 loss to Marco Fu. He reached the second round of the 2004 World Snooker Championship, where he lost 12–13 against Matthew Stevens, despite leading 10–6 and 12–10 at various stages of the match.

Hunter began the 2004–05 season by reaching the semi-finals of the Grand Prix, where he lost 3–6 to Ronnie O'Sullivan. Hunter won the pro-am competition 2004 Fürth Grand Prix, which was later renamed in his honour, winning the final 4–2 over Matthew Stevens. He reached the quarter-finals of the 2005 China Open just days after being diagnosed with cancer. His career-high ranking was number four in the world during the 2004-2005 season, which dropped to number five the following season.

Later years and illness (2005–2006) 
On 6 April 2005, Hunter announced he was suffering from malignant neuroendocrine tumours in his stomach, a rare disease, the cause of which is unknown. A spokesman for the World Professional Billiards and Snooker Association (WPBSA) said at the time: "Paul will undergo treatment to cure himself of this illness. He would like to reassure his fans and supporters that, as with his snooker career, he is tenacious and positive in his fight against the disease." Hunter received chemotherapy for his illness.

Hunter returned to the circuit for the start of the 2005–06 season but lost to Rory McLeod in the first round of the Grand Prix. Hunter's next match of the season was at the 2005 UK Championship against Jamie Burnett, in which Hunter came back from 6–8 down to win the match 9–8. Despite this, Hunter lost in the next round 2–9 against eventual champion Ding Junhui. He lost in the first round of the 2006 World Championship 5–10 to Neil Robertson, his last match.

He slipped from 5th to 34th in the 2006/2007 rankings. Hunter admitted he played worse than the previous year and confirmed that he had been in continuous pain. On 27 July 2006, the WPBSA confirmed, following a members' vote, the organization's rules would be changed to allow Hunter to sit out the entire 2006–2007 season with his world ranking frozen at 34. He intended devoting the year to treatment for his cancer.

Personal life
Hunter married beauty therapist, Lindsey Fell, in August 2004 in Jamaica. Because of his good looks, Hunter became known as the "Beckham of the Baize", with reference to football player David Beckham. After his death, Lindsey wrote Unbreakable: My Life with Paul – a Story of Extraordinary Courage and Love covering his snooker career, life and death.

Death 
Hunter died at 8:20 pm (GMT) on 9 October 2006, aged 27, at the Kirkwood Hospice in Huddersfield. Prior to the Premier League Snooker matches on 12 October 2006, players Jimmy White, Ronnie O'Sullivan, Ken Doherty and Ding Junhui, along with referee Alan Chamberlain and commentators Willie Thorne and Phil Yates, stood for a moment of silence to remember Hunter. He left a wife, Lindsey, and one daughter. His funeral took place on 19 October 2006 at Leeds Parish Church. Many players attended the ceremony, and his best friend, Matthew Stevens, was a pallbearer at the service.

Legacy
Fellow professionals Stephen Hendry, Mark Williams, Jimmy White, Matthew Stevens and Ken Doherty led calls for the Masters trophy to be named in Hunter's memory. Instead, the then non-ranking German Open in Fürth was renamed the Paul Hunter Classic in his honour; a tournament first won by Hunter. Also, in 2007, the amateur English Open tournament was renamed the Paul Hunter English Open. On 20 April 2016, the Masters trophy was renamed in Hunter's honour. World Snooker chairman Barry Hearn said that the organization "messed up" by not doing so sooner.

In 2006, Hunter was posthumously awarded the BBC Sports Personality of the Year Helen Rollason Award – his widow Lindsey accepted the award on his behalf. A Paul Hunter Foundation was set up after his death with the "specific aim of giving disadvantaged, able bodied and disabled youngsters an opportunity to play snooker". Hunter compiled 114 competitive century breaks in the course of his professional career, including a high break of 146.

Performance and rankings timeline

Career finals

Ranking finals: 5 (3 titles)

Non-ranking finals:  4 (4 titles)

Pro-am finals: 1 (1 title)

Amateur finals: 1

References

Further reading

External links
 
 BBC Sport's Paul Hunter tribute in pictures

1978 births
Snooker players from Leeds
2006 deaths
Deaths from cancer in England
Deaths from stomach cancer
Masters (snooker) champions
People educated at Cardinal Heenan Catholic High School, Leeds